The FIS Ski Jumping Alpen Cup (known as Alpen Cup) is a ski jumping tournament held in Alps yearly by the International Ski Federation since 1990.

History
The first season of this competition took place in the 1990/91 season. The summer season was introduced in 1996/97. In the 1999/00 season two separate classifications, summer and winter, were introduced for the first time, while both together counted for overall classification. From the 2000-01 season one only overall classification exists, joining the points from summer and winter together.

This competition is only for junior ski jumpers of maximum 20 years old. Until the 2005/06 season, the limit was 18 years old. Until the 2006-07 season, only jumpers from Alpine countries were allowed to compete. From the 2007/08 season onward, ski jumpers from Eastern European countries: Bulgarians, Czechs, Poles, Romanians, Slovaks and Hungarians, can compete too.

In the years 2000-2004 and from the 2013/14 season, the Alpen Cup takes place also in the women's category.

Higher competitive circuits are the World Cup, the Summer Grand Prix and the Continental Cup; the lower circuits include the FIS Cup and the FIS Race.

Men's standings

Overall

Summer

Ladies' standings

Overall

References

 
Ski jumping competitions
Jumping
Recurring sporting events established in 1990
1990 establishments in Europe